is a professional Japanese baseball player. He plays infielder for the Hiroshima Toyo Carp.

His elder brother Hiroki is also a professional baseball player currently playing for Hanshin Tigers.

External links

NPB.com

1990 births
Living people
Baseball people from Hiroshima Prefecture
People from Fukuyama, Hiroshima
Meiji University alumni
Japanese baseball players
Nippon Professional Baseball infielders
Hiroshima Toyo Carp players